Rinus Gosens (January 1, 1920 in Schiedam, South Holland – May 22, 2008 in Eindhoven) was a football (soccer) player and manager from the Netherlands. As a player, he won the Dutch championship with SVV in 1949. After his active career he became a football manager, who worked for Fortuna Vlaardingen, SVV, Heracles Almelo, FC Eindhoven and FC Den Bosch.

References

External links
 Profile 

1920 births
2008 deaths
Dutch footballers
Dutch football managers
Footballers from Schiedam
SV SVV players
Fortuna Vlaardingen players
Heracles Almelo managers
FC Den Bosch managers
FC Eindhoven managers
SV SVV managers

Association footballers not categorized by position
Fortuna Vlaardingen managers